is a Japanese term describing modern Japanese martial arts. Literally translated it means the "Martial Way", and may be thought of as the "Way of War" or the "Way of Martial Arts".

Etymology
Budō is a compound of the root bu (武:ぶ), meaning "war" or "martial"; and dō (道:どう; dào in Chinese), meaning "path" or "way" (including the ancient Indic Dharmic and Buddhist conception of "path", or mārga in Sanskrit). 
Budō is the idea of formulating propositions, subjecting them to philosophical critique and then following a "path" to realize them. Dō signifies a "way of life". Dō in the Japanese context is an experiential term in the sense that practice (the way of life) is the norm to verify the validity of the discipline cultivated through a given art form. Modern budō has no external enemy, only the internal one: the ego that must be fought.

Similarly to budō, bujutsu is a compound of the roots bu (武), and jutsu (術:じゅつ), meaning technique. Thus, budō is translated as "martial way", or "the way of war" while bujutsu is translated as "science of war" or "martial craft."  However, both budō and bujutsu are used interchangeably in English with the term "martial arts". Budo and bujutsu have quite a delicate difference; whereas bujutsu only gives attention to the physical part of fighting (how to best defeat an enemy), budo also gives attention to the mind and how one should develop oneself.  

The first significant occurrences of the word budō date back to the Kōyō Gunkan (16th century) and were used to describe the samurai lifestyle rather than the practice of martial techniques. The word was later re-theorized and redefined to the definition we know today. First by Nishikubo Hiromichi and the Dai Nippon Butokukai when the name of their vocational school for martial arts was changed from bujutsu senmon gakkō to budō senmon gakkō. And later by Kanō Jigorō, judo's founder, when he chose to name his art judo instead of jujutsu.

Typical budo styles 

 Aikido
 Iaido
 Jodo
 Judo
 Jujutsu
 Karate
 Kendo
 Kūdō
 Kyūdō
 Shōrinji kempō
 Sumo

Bujutsu

In modern history usage, bujutsu translates as martial art, military science, or military strategy depending on context, and is typified by its practical application of technique to real-world or battlefield situations.  Budō, meaning martial way, has a more philosophical emphasis, but in actual usage, budo is considered the general term for all martial arts in Japan.

Civilian vs. military
Many consider budō a more civilian form of martial arts, as an interpretation or evolution of the older bujutsu, which they categorize as a more militaristic style or strategy.  According to this distinction, the modern civilian art de-emphasizes practicality and effectiveness in favor of personal development from a fitness or spiritual perspective.  The difference is between the more "civilian" versus "military" aspects of combat and personal development.  They see budō and bujutsu as representing a particular strategy or philosophy regarding combat systems, but still, the terms are rather loosely applied and often interchangeable.

Art vs. lifestyle
One view is that a bujutsu is the martial art you practice, whereas a budo is the lifestyle you live and the path you walk by practicing a bujutsu.  For example, one could say that judo and jujutsu practised as a martial art are one and the same, meaning that the practice of the art jujutsu leads to obtaining the lifestyle of judo (Judo was originally known as Kano Jujutsu, after judo's founder Kanō Jigorō). That would also be true for arts such as kenjutsu/kendo and iaijutsu/iaido.

Recreational sport
Budō was featured in the Summer Olympic Games demonstration programme in 1964.

References

External links
Archives of Budo

Japanese martial arts